Tour Eqho (also known as Tour IBM, and Tour Descartes) is an office skyscraper located in La Défense business district situated west of Paris, France.

Built in 1988, the tower, with a height of 130 metres, belongs to the third generation of towers in La Défense. The tower takes the shape of a parallelepiped in which a semi-cylinder would have been extruded on the main façade.  Tour Descartes used to host the French headquarters of IBM Corporation until 2010. It now hosts a variety of companies with KPMG taking the most floors.

See also 
 Skyscraper
 La Défense
 List of tallest structures in Paris

References

External links 
 Tour Eqho 

Eqho
Eqho
IBM facilities
Buildings and structures completed in 1988